The Kenyon Observer, founded in 1989 by David Horner and Alex Novak, began as a conservative, undergraduate political journal at Kenyon College in Gambier, Ohio. After the journal briefly ceased publication after the fall of 2009, it was re-established in the fall of 2011 by Jonathan Green '14 and Gabriel Rom '14. The current iteration of the Observer features contributions from Kenyon students of all political ideologies, keeping with the Observer's tradition of publishing high-quality student writing without any ideological label or bent. 

In addition to publishing student commentary, the journal has featured interviews with scholars and pundits such as Ezra Klein, Austan Goolsbee, Neera Tanden, Robert Putnam, Ross Douthat, Branko Milanovic, Norman Podhoretz, Ross Eisenbrey, Andrew Sullivan, Lt. Gen. William Odom, Benjamin Barber, Francis Fukuyama, John Agresto, Mark Strand, Victor Davis Hanson, David Brooks, Paul Gottfried,  H.R. McMaster, and Harvey Mansfield.

Many contributors and editors of the journal have continued their career in political journalism, writing and editing for some of the most influential political publications, including The Washington Post, The Los Angeles Times, AmericaBlog, Taki's Magazine, The Daily Dot, The Jewish Daily Forward, The Times of Israel, The Public Interest, The National Interest, Salon, The American Interest, The Weekly Standard, The Huffington Post, National Review, The New Criterion, Commentary Magazine, The American Spectator, Forbes, and The New York Sun.

Alumni of The Kenyon Observer have also gone on to Washington D.C. to work for prominent organizations, such as the National Policy Institute, Data For Progress, the Arab American Institute, Roosevelt Institute, Cato Institute, the Project for the New American Century, the American Enterprise Institute, Intercollegiate Studies Institute, the American Israel Public Affairs Committee, and Regnery Publishing. David Skinner, an Observer alumnus, is Editor of the NEH's Humanities Magazine. Evan McLaren, a prominent white nationalist and director of the National Policy Institute, was a major contributor to the Observer, and its editor-in-chief from 2007 to 2008.

References

External links

1989 establishments in Ohio
Conservative magazines published in the United States
Observer
Magazines established in 1989
Magazines published in Ohio
Magazines established in 2011
Student magazines published in the United States